Hi!! is an English Language Sri Lankan society and lifestyle magazine, first published in March 2003, under the Wijeya Newspapers group. It covers a variety of areas, from lifestyle, parties, events, fashion, hotels, restaurants, and tourist attractions. Its founding editor was Shyamalee Tudawe.

The 100th issue was launched in August 2021.

References

External links

Magazines published in Sri Lanka
Magazines established in 2003
Mass media in Colombo
English-language magazines
Monthly magazines
Online magazines
Magazines